KMFM Ashford is an Independent Local Radio serving the borough of Ashford and the surrounding areas in Kent, South East England. It is the Ashford region of the KMFM radio network (owned by the KM Group), containing local advertisements and sponsorships for the area amongst a countywide schedule of programming.

History
A radio station for Ashford was considered in 2001 by the Radio Authority as Ashford was the only borough in East Kent not to be granted a licence in the mid-1990s, but the applications for the Ashford licence were not advertised by Ofcom until July 2004, with six companies making the final shortlist. Restricted Service Licences were broadcast by some of these companies, including Ashford FM between 1996 and 2002 on 106.5 FM, and Ashford Local Radio in 2003.

The licence was awarded to an organisation called LARK FM (Local Ashford Radio Kent) in which the KM Group had a majority stake, with the station broadcasting under the KMFM brand already used by five other stations in Kent. KMFM Ashford officially launched on 3 October 2005. This decision caused a High Court Challenge by rival bidder A-Ten FM, with the chairman claiming "Ofcom have failed in their principal duty to encourage competition and diversity of choice for listeners. They have ignored what Parliament intended and more importantly what the people of Ashford wanted. Although I believe some local people supported the trial broadcasts of Lark FM, what KM are now offering bears no resemblance. Even the local news bulletins will be piped in from elsewhere in Kent". This challenge was subsequently lost.

After the station's launch, it achieved a 42% reach in its first RAJAR sweep

It shared offices with sister paper the Kentish Express, before being moved to the Medway studios following the arrival of the county-wide breakfast show.

Like the rest of the KMFM network, the station was relaunched in September 2010 with new jingles, schedule changes and more emphasis on music.

The KMFM network switched to a contemporary hit radio format in 2012 following the merging of KMFM Extra with KMFM. The music now focuses mainly on Top 40 hits, and contains a lot more dance and R&B than before.

Programming
All programming across the KMFM network was shared across all seven stations following OFCOM approval in February 2012. The local breakfast show, by then the only local show on the station, was replaced by a county-wide show on 12 March 2012.

Until 2007 KMFM Ashford produced its own programmes during daytimes, before it joined up with KMFM Shepway and White Cliffs Country to network all programmes other than breakfast. The stations joined together with KMFM Canterbury and KMFM Thanet to create an East Kent network in April 2009, before all programmes apart from weekday/Saturday breakfast and Sunday afternoons were networked across all KMFM stations in September 2009. In July 2010, Saturday breakfast and Sunday afternoons became networked.

News bulletins come from the KMFM News Centre in the Medway studios on the hour from 6am - 6pm on weekdays, and 8am - 1pm on weekends. National news bulletins come from Sky News Radio outside these times. Traffic and travel updates are broadcast just before the hour, and every 20 minutes between 7am - 9am and 4pm - 7pm.

Presenters

Current presenters
 Tony Blackburn
 Dave Pearce

Former presenters
 Myma Seldon
 Benedict Smith
 Melanie Sykes

References

External links
 KMFM Ashford

Ashford
Radio stations established in 2005
Radio stations in Kent
Borough of Ashford
Folkestone and Hythe District
Contemporary hit radio stations in the United Kingdom